Xanthorhoe mirabilata is a species of geometrid moth in the family Geometridae.

This moth's typical range is the south-western United States, primarily Arizona, New Mexico, and Colorado. 

The MONA or Hodges number for Xanthorhoe mirabilata is 7392.

References

Further reading

 
 

Xanthorhoe
Articles created by Qbugbot
Moths described in 1883